The Sang'oro Hydroelectric Power Station is a  hydroelectric power station on the Sondu River in Kenya.

Location
The coordinates of Sang'oro Hydroelectric Power Station are:0°21'13.0"S, 34°48'48.0"E (Latitude:-0.353623; Longitude:34.813341).

Overview
After Sondu Miriu Hydroelectric Power Station was built, in order to minimize water wastage, a decision was made to use Sondu Miriu's effluent water to power another power station. The new station, Sang'oro Hydroelectric Power Station, was built between 2008 and 2013, at the confluence of the discharge channel from Sondu Miriu and the Sondu River. Japan International Cooperation Agency loaned funds and Kenya Electricity Generating Company contributed equity to the construction bill of US$78 million (Sh6.5 billion).

Ownership
Sang'oro Hydroelectric Power Station is 100 percent owned by Kenya Electricity Generating Company, a parastatal company of the government of Kenya.

See also

List of power stations in Kenya

References

External links
Kisumu: Irony of dark city that hosts power plants
Sondu powers stability in national grid

Hydroelectric power stations in Kenya
Dams in Kenya
Dams completed in 2013
Energy infrastructure completed in 2013
Kisumu County